Quartet (London) 1985 is a live album by composer and saxophonist Anthony Braxton recorded in England by BBC Radio 3 in 1985 and first released on the Leo label as a limited edition 3LP Box Set in 1988 before being released as a double CD in 1990.

Reception

The Allmusic review by Stewart Mason stated "the resulting music is completely fascinating".

Track listing
All compositions by Anthony Braxton.

Disc one
 First set - 56:10
 "Composition 122 (+ 108 A)"
 "Composition 40 (O)"
 "Collage Form Structure"
 "Composition 52"
 "Composition 86 (+ 32 + 96)"
 "Piano Solo from Composition 30"
 "Composition 115"

Disc two
 Second set - 65:30
 "Composition 105 A"
 "Percussion Solo from Composition 96"
 "Composition 40 F"
 "Composition 121"
 "Composition 116"

Personnel 
Anthony Braxton – clarinet, flute, alto saxophone, C melody saxophone, sopranino saxophone
Marilyn Crispell – piano
Mark Dresser – bass
Gerry Hemingway – drums

References

Leo Records live albums
Anthony Braxton live albums
1988 live albums